Thabet is both a surname and a given name. Notable people with the name include:

 Hasheem Thabeet (born 1987), Tanzanian basketball player
 Kamel Amin Thaabet (1924-65), Israeli spy
 Safwan Thabet (born 1946), Egyptian businessman
 Tarek Thabet (born 1971), Tunisian footballer
 Thabet El-Batal (1953-2005), Egyptian footballer
 Thaer Thabet (21st century), Iraqi journalist
 Yasser Thabet (21st century), Egyptian journalist

See also 

 Tabet
 Thabet